Marshall Township is a township in Pocahontas County, Iowa, USA.

History
Marshall Township was established in 1882 as Laurens Township, in honor of Henry Laurens and John Laurens. However, in 1884, the citizens, many of whom hailed from Marshall County, successfully petitioned that the name be changed to Marshall.

References

Townships in Pocahontas County, Iowa
Townships in Iowa